is a passenger railway station in the city of Shimotsuma, Ibaraki Prefecture, Japan operated by the private railway company Kantō Railway.

Lines

Station layout
The station has two opposed side platforms  connected to the station building by a level crossing. The station is unattended.

Platforms

Adjacent stations

History
Tobanoe Station was opened on 15 August 1926 as a station on the Jōsō Railroad, which became the Kantō Railway in 1965. The station building was rebuilt in October 2008.

Passenger statistics
In fiscal 2017, the station was used by an average of 79 passengers daily (boarding passengers only).

Surrounding area
 Shimotsuma Road Station

See also
 List of railway stations in Japan

References

External links

 Kantō Railway Station Information 

Railway stations in Ibaraki Prefecture
Railway stations in Japan opened in 1926
Shimotsuma, Ibaraki